Bartłomiej Grzelak  (born 9 August 1981) is a Polish former professional footballer.

Club career
In the summer 2005, he joined Widzew Łódź on a three-year contract.

In December 2006, he moved to Legia Warsaw on three and a half contract.

In the summer 2010, he joined Russian club FC Sibir Novosibirsk.

In the winter 2011, he joined Polish club Jagiellonia Białystok.

In the winter 2012, he joined Polish club Górnik Zabrze on a one-year contract, but he was injured in a friendly match with MFK Ružomberok and the club terminated the contract with him after four days.

Successes
 1x Polish Cup Winner (2007/2008) with Legia Warsaw.

National team
Grzelak made his debut for the Poland national football team in a friendly versus the United Arab Emirates in Abu Dhabi on December 6, 2006, scoring twice.

International goals
Scores and results list. Poland's goal tally first.

References

External links
 
 

1981 births
Living people
Polish footballers
Polish expatriate footballers
ŁKS Łódź players
Unia Janikowo players
Widzew Łódź players
Legia Warsaw players
Poland international footballers
Expatriate footballers in Russia
Russian Premier League players
FC Sibir Novosibirsk players
Jagiellonia Białystok players
MKS Cracovia (football) players
Górnik Zabrze players
Wisła Płock players
Sportspeople from Płock
Association football forwards